Vyara Assembly constituency is one of the 182 Legislative Assembly constituencies of Gujarat state in India. It is part of Tapi district and is reserved for candidates belonging to the autochthonous Adivasi Scheduled Tribes. It is a segment of Bardoli Lok Sabha constituency.

List of segments

This assembly seat represents the following segments,

 Vyara Taluka

Members of Vidhan Sabha

 1990 - Amarsinh Z Chaudhari (Independent), defeated his namesake Amarsinh B Chaudhari (Congress) 
 Amarsinh Zinabhai Chaudhari was elected to Lok Sabha as Congress candidate from Mandvi in 1971.

Election results

2022

2017

2012

1990
 Amarsinh Zinabhai Chaudhary (IND) : 34,320 votes  
 Amarsinh Bhilabhai Chaudhari (INC) : 32,612

1985
 Amarsinh Bhilabhai Chaudhari (INC) : 41,711 votes
 Patel Dhirubhai Bhenklabhai (CPI) : 2,811

See also
 List of constituencies of Gujarat Legislative Assembly
 Gujarat Legislative Assembly

References

External links
 

Assembly constituencies of Gujarat
Tapi district
Year of establishment missing